René Shuman (born 5 December 1967) is a Dutch singer, guitarist, composer and producer.

Shuman gained national fame through his performance in Henny Huisman's Soundmixshow. He came in second with Elvis Presley's repertoire, a rendition of the songs "Are You Lonesome Tonight?" and "Don't Be Cruel". 
He performed several times with the original band members of Elvis Presley, both in group form and individually. He was on stage with The Jordanaires (Elvis' original vocal group), the TCB Band, drummer DJ Fontana, Cherrill Nielsen, Charly Hodge and guitarist Scotty Moore. In 1999, Shuman presented Scotty Moore with a Lifetime Achievement Award in Amsterdam.

Shuman has been nicknamed the "Dutch Elvis". Despite the fact that the Dutch public often associates Shuman with the music of Elvis Presley, it took until 2003 before he released a cover of 'the King' together with singer Angel-Eye. His repertoire until then was mostly self-produced.

Shuman included "Rhythm of My Heart", a song written by Marc Jordan and John Capek, on his 1986 debut album, René Shuman. In 1991, British singer Rod Stewart recorded the song for his album Vagabond Heart.  Stewart's version reached  3 on the UK Singles Chart, No. 5 on the US Billboard Hot 100, and No. 1 on the Canadian and Irish charts. 

He married his partner Angel-Eye in February 2009.

References

1957 births
Living people
Dutch country singers
Dutch producers
Dutch composers
People from Geleen
21st-century Dutch singers